The Big Story is a primetime newscast currently broadcast on One News every weeknights at 8:00 PM (PST). It also served as the de facto late-night newscast of TV5 from March to September 2019. It is anchored by Roby Alampay and Gretchen Ho.

History
Bloomberg TV Philippines launches its first-ever primetime news program, The Big Story, which was first aired on October 24, 2016, at 8:45 pm. It continued to run until the local Bloomberg channel relaunched as One News on May 28, 2018, and expanded its airtime, with an earlier timeslot at 8:00 pm.

On March 4, 2019, the program began broadcasting on free TV via One News' sister channel, TV5, replacing Aksyon Tonite as a late-night newscast and airs every weeknights at 10:00 PM, (PST). It is the first English-language newscast of the network since Big News from 1992 to 2004 and Sentro from 2007 to 2008. However, it was replaced by the delayed telecast of One Balita Pilipinas, produced by sister station One PH beginning September 23, 2019, anchored by former Aksyon Tonite anchor Cheryl Cosim.

On February 1, 2021, Gretchen Ho serves as a main presenter in the program, alongside Frontline sa Umaga as well as segment host for sports on Frontline Pilipinas on TV5.

Presenters

Main presenter 
 Roby Alampay (2016–present)
 Gretchen Ho (2021–present)

Substitute presenter 
 Ed Lingao (2016–present)
 Jes Delos Santos (2019–present)
 Jay Taruc (2021–present)
 Maricel Halili (2021–present)
 Shawn Yao (2022–present)

References

External links
  (on TV5)

2016 Philippine television series debuts
2020s Philippine television series
One News (TV channel) original programming
TV5 (Philippine TV network) news shows
TV5 (Philippine TV network) original programming
Philippine television news shows
English-language television shows
Flagship evening news shows